Cohnella hongkongensis, formerly known as Paenibacillus hongkongensis, is a species in the bacterial genus Cohnella. It is Gram-positive, rod-shaped and endospore-forming, with type strain HKU3T (=CCUG 49571T =CIP 107898T =DSM 17642T).

References

Further reading

External links

LPSN
WORMS
Type strain of Cohnella hongkongensis at BacDive -  the Bacterial Diversity Metadatabase

Paenibacillaceae